Baoruco (or Bahoruco) may refer to:

 Baoruco Province, in the Dominican Republic
 Baoruco Mountain Range with Sierra de Bahoruco National Park
 Bahoruco River